FC Bayterek (Báıterek fýtbol Klýby) are a Kazakh football club based at the Astana Arena in Astana. The club is a state sports project, dedicated to play Kazakh graduates of Brazilian football academy Olé Brasil Futebol Clube. In its first season in 2012 Bayterek had mix of graduates born 1994 and experienced professionals. However, in future it is planned to have purely graduates of the academy.

History
In 2009, 26 young players (born in 1994) were selected by Football Federation of Kazakhstan for training at international football academy Olé Brasil Futebol Clube. After graduation in March 2012, Agency of Sports & Physical Culture of RoK decided to create a new football team named FC Bayterek to participate in First Division and further development of the graduates. Due to young age of players (17–18 years) and possible difficulty playing against older opponents, the club included several experienced professionals. A total of 27 players, 15 of which graduated of the Brazilian academy, were chosen as the final roster. In March 2012 a second group of players (born 1997) was sent to the academy.
The third group of trainees (born 2000) were sent to Cruzeiro academy in March 2015.

Domestic history

Kazakh graduates of Olé  Brasil C.F. (born 1994)
Period of study (March 2009 – March 2012). Updated as of start of 2015 season.

Kazakh graduates of Olé  Brasil C.F. (born 1997)
Period of study (March 2012 – March 2015). Updated as of start of 2015 season.

Kazakh trainees of Cruzeiro E.C. (born 2000)
Period of study (March 2015 – March 2018).,

References

External links
Squad list at KFF

2012 establishments in Kazakhstan
Football clubs in Astana
Football clubs in Kazakhstan